Juan Ortiz de Zárate (1581 – 24 April, 1646) was a Roman Catholic prelate who served as Bishop of Salamanca (1645–1646).

Biography
Juan Ortiz de Zárate was born in Aranda de Duero in 1581.
On 14 May 1645, he was selected by the King of Spain and confirmed by Pope Innocent X as Bishop of Salamanca.
On 30 November 1645, he was consecrated bishop by Diego Arce Reinoso, Bishop of Plasencia, with Miguel Avellán, Titular Bishop of Siriensis, and Pedro Orozco, Titular Bishop of Temnus, serving as co-consecrators. 
He served as Bishop of Salamanca until his death on 24 April 1646.

References 

17th-century Roman Catholic bishops in Spain
Bishops appointed by Pope Innocent X
1581 births
1646 deaths